The 1883 Rhode Island gubernatorial election was held on April 4, 1883. Republican nominee Augustus O. Bourn defeated Democratic nominee William Sprague IV with 54.48% of the vote.

General election

Candidates
Major party candidates
Augustus O. Bourn, Republican
William Sprague IV, Democratic

Other candidates
Charles R. Cutler, Independent

Results

References

1883
Rhode Island